Thomas Sherren Whittaker (26 January 1868  – 8 February 1914) was an English rugby union forward who was a member of the British Isles XV that toured South Africa in 1891. Whittaker was also an original member of invitational touring team, the Barbarians

Personal life
Whittaker was born in Beckenham, Kent in 1868 to Thomas Earle and Francis Jane Whittaker. He was educated at Rugby School before matriculating to Trinity College, Cambridge in 1887. On 12 June 1888 he began his legal career when he was admitted at the Middle Temple, and in 1890 he was awarded his BA. He was called to the Bar in 1892. At the time of his death in 1914, he was a Barrister of Law, with a practice at Temple in London and a private residence on Callis-Court Road in Broadstairs, Kent.

Rugby career
Despite Whittaker attending Rugby School, whose members filled the ranks of Cambridge University rugby club, there is no record of Whittaker playing for the University team. On the year he graduated from University, Whittaker is recorded as representing Manchester Rugby Club, and during the same year was invited by Percy Carpmael to join the very first Barbarian team. 

In 1891, Whittaker was approached to join Bill Maclagan's British Isles team on their first sanctioned overseas rugby union tour, played in South Africa. Whitaker played in 17 matches of the tour including all three Tests against the South African national team. In the First Test, at Port Elizabeth, Whittaker scored his one and only international try, in the 4-0 victory over the Springboks. In total Whittaker amassed seven tries over the tour, including two tries in the 22-0 win over Port Elizabeth in the sixth game.

Notes

References
 
 

1868 births
1914 deaths
Alumni of Trinity College, Cambridge
Barbarian F.C. players
British & Irish Lions rugby union players from England
English rugby union players
Lancashire County RFU players
People educated at Rugby School
Rugby union forwards
Rugby union players from Beckenham